Eureka is an unincorporated community in Marion County, Florida, United States. The community sits on a small rise on the west side of the Ocklawaha River.

References

Unincorporated communities in Marion County, Florida
Unincorporated communities in Florida